Leonida Gichevska (born 20 June 1998) is a Macedonian female handballer for ESBF Besançon and the North Macedonia national team.

She represented the North Macedonia at the 2022 European Women's Handball Championship.

References

External links

1998 births
Living people
People from Sveti Nikole
Expatriate handball players